Kathryn J Boor is an American food scientist and academic administrator. She is the dean of Cornell University Graduate School and vice provost for graduate education. Previously she served as the Ronald P Lynch Dean of the Cornell University College of Agriculture and Life Sciences.

Early life 
Boor was born and raised on a family-owned dairy farm in Chemung County in upstate New York. She obtained a BS in Food Science from Cornell University in 1980, and an MS in Food Science from the University of Wisconsin-Madison in 1983. Her MS research with Winrock International in Kenya focused on improving human nutrition among limited-resource farmers. She returned to the US and earned a PhD in Microbiology at the University of California, Davis in 1994.

Career 
Boor returned to Cornell University in 1994 and became the first tenured female Associate Professor in the Department of Food Science. She established the Food Safety Laboratory. Her research focuses on identifying biological factors that affect the transmission of bacteria in food systems. A newly discovered bacterium was named Listeria booriae to honor her work on Listeria monocytogenes, a food-borne pathogen. She was appointed as the Ronald P. Lynch Dean in 2010.

Awards and honors 

 2000 USDA Honor Award as a member of the Listeria Outbreak Working Group
 2000 Foundation Scholar Award from the American Dairy Science Association
 2006 DeLaval Dairy Extension Award from the American Dairy Science Association
 2002 Samuel Cate Prescott Award for outstanding research from the Institute of Food Technologists
 Fellow of the American Academy of Microbiology
 Fellow of the International Academy of Food Science and Technology
 Fellow of the Institute of Food Technologists
 Fellow of the American Association for the Advancement of Science
 Fellow of the American Dairy Science Association
 Honorary Doctorate from Harper Adams University in the United Kingdom in 2016 
 2018 Woman of Distinction by New York Senate 
 2020 Harris Award for Excellence in Food Science and Technology, The Ohio State University
 2020 Gerhard J. Haas Award for creative work in microbial food safety, Institute of Food Technologists
 2020 Distinguished Service Citation, New York State Agricultural Society

References

External links
  Cornell CALS College Leadership

American food scientists
Cornell University College of Agriculture and Life Sciences alumni
Cornell University faculty
People from Chemung County, New York
University of California, Davis alumni
Living people
Year of birth missing (living people)
Fellows of the American Academy of Microbiology